Joffrey can refer to: 

 Joffrey Tower, a Chicago high-rise
 Joffrey Ballet, a Chicago-based ballet company
 Robert Joffrey, American dancer and founder of the ballet company
 Joffrey Lupul, Canadian professional ice hockey player
 Joffrey Reynolds, former professional Canadian football player
 Joffrey Baratheon, a character from George R. R. Martin's series A Song of Ice and Fire  and its HBO television adaptation Game of Thrones

See also 
 Geoffrey (name)